Ronny & Julia was the Sveriges Television's Christmas calendar in 2000.

Plot 
The series is based on the Måns Gahrton and Johan Unenge books about Ronny & Julia, and is a modern retelling of William Shakespeare's Romeo and Juliet, but friendly to children and family, and with a happy ending.

Video 
The series was released to VHS in the year 2000. and to DVD on 27 October 2006.

References

External links 
 
 

2000 Swedish television series debuts
2000 Swedish television series endings
Sveriges Television's Christmas calendar
2000s Swedish television series